The Thinker is a bronze sculpture by Auguste Rodin, usually placed on a stone pedestal. The work depicts a nude male figure of heroic size sitting on a rock. He is seen leaning over, his right elbow placed on his left thigh, holding the weight of his chin on the back of his right hand. The pose is one of deep thought and contemplation, and the statue is often used as an image to represent philosophy.

Rodin conceived the figure as part of his work The Gates of Hell commissioned in 1880, but the first of the familiar monumental bronze castings was made in 1904, and is now exhibited at the Musée Rodin, in Paris.

There are also 27 other known full-sized castings, in which the figure is approximately 185 cm (73 inches) high, although not all were made during Rodin's lifetime and under his supervision. There are various other versions, several in plaster, and studies and posthumous castings exist in a range of sizes.

Origin

The Thinker was initially named The Poet, and was part of a large commission begun in 1880 for a doorway surround called The Gates of Hell. Rodin based this on the early 14th century poem The Divine Comedy by Dante Alighieri, and most of the figures in the work represented the main characters in the poem with The Thinker at the center of the composition over the doorway and somewhat larger than most of the other figures. Some critics believe that it was originally intended to depict Dante at the gates of Hell, pondering his great poem. Other critics reject that theory, pointing out that the figure is naked while Dante is fully clothed throughout his poem, and that the sculpture's physique does not correspond to Dante's effete figure.  The sculpture is nude, as Rodin wanted a heroic figure in the tradition of Michelangelo, to represent intellect as well as poetry. Other critics came to see the sculpture as a self-portrait. 

This detail from the Gates of Hell was first named The Thinker by foundry workers, who noted its similarity to Michelangelo's statue of Lorenzo de Medici called Il Pensieroso (The Thinker), and Rodin decided to treat the figure as an independent work at a larger size.  The figure was designed to be seen from below and is normally displayed on a fairly high plinth, although the heights vary considerably chosen by the various owners.

Casts

The Thinker has been cast in multiple versions and is found around the world, but the history of the progression from models to castings is still not entirely clear. About 28 monumental-sized bronze casts are in museums and public places. In addition, there are sculptures of different study-sized scales and plaster versions (often painted bronze) in both monumental and study sizes. Some newer castings have been produced posthumously and are not considered part of the original production.

Rodin made the first small plaster version around 1881. The first full-scale model was presented at the Salon des Beaux-Arts in Paris in 1904. A public subscription financed a bronze casting, which became the property of the City of Paris, and was put in front of the Panthéon.  In 1922, the original bronze was moved to the Rodin Museum.

Art market 
In June 2022 a posthumous cast was offered for auction at  Christie's in Paris with an estimate of €9m to €14m. The cast was made around 1928 at the Rudier Foundry, the family business founded by Alexis Rudier (1845-1897) who collaborated with Antoine Bourdelle and Aristide Maillol, before his son Eugène (1875-1952) took over.

See also
List of sculptures by Auguste Rodin

References

External links
The "Penseur", a poem by Philadelphia poet Florence Earle Coates at Wikisource
 Rodin: The B. Gerald Cantor Collection, a full text exhibition catalog from The Metropolitan Museum of Art, which contains material on The Thinker
 Link to The Thinker at the official Web site of the Musée Rodin.
 The Thinker Inspiration, Analysis and Critical Reception
 The Thinker project , Munich. Discussion of the history of the many casts of this artwork.
 The Thinker, Iris & B. Gerald Cantor Center for Visual Arts at Stanford University, Object Number 1988.106, bronze cast No. 10, edition of 12.
 Auguste Rodin and The Thinker , the story behind his most iconic sculpture of all time at biography.com.

1902 sculptures
Bronze sculptures in the United States
Collection of the Baltimore Museum of Art
Dante Alighieri
Nude sculptures
Outdoor sculptures in San Francisco
Sculptures by Auguste Rodin
Sculptures of the Alte Nationalgalerie
Sculptures of the Musée Rodin
Sculptures of the Ny Carlsberg Glyptotek